Climate of Georgia may refer to:
Climate of Georgia (U.S. state)
Climate of Georgia (country)